End of Love may refer to:

 End of Love (album), a 2005 album by indie rock band Clem Snide
 "End of Love" (song), a song on Anna Abreu's 2007 album Anna Abreu
 End of Love (band)
 End of Love (film), a 2009 Hong Kong film directed by Simon Chung
 The End of Love, a 2012 drama film directed by Mark Webber